The Havana Club International Cocktail Grand Prix it is an international bartending competition that began in 1996. Since then the competition has taken place every two years in Havana, Cuba. The Grand Prix is organized by Havana Club, with the support of the Cuban Cantineros Club.  The International Bartenders Association (IBA) is an associated sponsor of the competition.

The Havana Club International Cocktail Grand Prix is truly an international competition, drawing in top talent from over 30 different countries. After pre-qualifying in national competitions, the finalists gather in Havana for the final stage of the competition.

Winners

Rules
In the 8th International Cocktail Grand Prix in May 2010, bartenders were judged on the following criteria- their knowledge, their mixing techniques, the quality of their drinks, and their overall image.

Competitors are permitted to bring their own barware, tools, and ingredients. Each competitor has 10 minutes to prepare three original cocktails. The first cocktail must use Havana Club rum as its base and the second must use Havana Añejo 7 Años. The third cocktail must be a reinvention of a classic Cuban rum cocktail. While preparing their drinks the participants must be able to hold a conversation and multi-task.

The bartenders are judged out of 250 points : 150 points for the three cocktails based on the appearance, aroma, taste, finish and balance of the drink, and another possible 100 points for the technical skill, knowledge, innovative thinking, creativity, communication skills and overall image of the bartender. The final four competitors have 15 minutes to prepare the same three drinks, plus an additional drink that will test their creativity using secret ingredients given to them at the last minute.

References

Further reading

External links
 Cuban Rum
 Cuban Rum Cocktail Recipes
 Drinkology
 Havana Guide- Cuban Rum
 Havana Club Heritage
 International Bartender's Association
 Adventures of a Cocktail Enthusiast
 cócteles
 Yoga & Gimlets

Bartending